Since 15 January 2015, the relationship between Serbia and the North Atlantic Treaty Organization (NATO) has been regulated in the context of an Individual Partnership Action Plan (IPAP).

Background

Yugoslavia's communist government sided with the Eastern Bloc at the beginning of the Cold War, but pursued a policy of neutrality following the Tito–Stalin split in 1948. It was a founding member of the Non-Aligned Movement in 1961. Since that country's dissolution most of its successor states have joined NATO, but the largest of them, Serbia, has maintained Yugoslavia's policy of neutrality.

1992–2006: Yugoslav Wars, non-alignment

The NATO intervention in Bosnia and Herzegovina in 1992 against Bosnian-Serbian forces during the Bosnian War and in 1999 in the Kosovo War by bombing targets in Serbia (then part of FR Yugoslavia) strained relations between Serbia and NATO.. After the overthrow of President Slobodan Milošević, Serbia wanted to improve its relations with NATO. However membership in the military alliance remained highly controversial, because among political parties and large sections of society there were still resentments due to the bombings in 1999. In the years under Prime Minister Zoran Đinđić the country (then Serbia and Montenegro) did not rule out joining NATO. However, after Đinđić's assassination in 2003, Serbia increasingly started pursuing a course of military neutrality.  Serbia's Parliament passed a resolution in 2007 which declared their military neutrality until such time as a referendum was held on the issue.

2006–2011: Entry into the Partnership for Peace 
Serbia joined the Partnership for Peace programme during the 2006 Riga Summit. While this programme is sometimes the first step towards full NATO membership, it was uncertain whether Serbia perceives it as signaling an intent to join the alliance.  However, the West's broad recognition of Kosovo's contested declaration of independence in January 2008, while it was a protectorate of the United Nations with security support from NATO, further strained relations between Serbia and NATO.

Although current Serbian priorities do not include NATO membership, the Alliance offered Serbia an invitation to enter the intensified dialogue programme in 2008 whenever the country was ready. On 1 October 2008, Serbian Defence Minister Dragan Šutanovac signed the Information Exchange Agreement with the NATO, one of the prerequisites for fuller membership in the Partnership for Peace programme.

2011–2022: Individual Partnership Action Plan 
In April 2011 Serbia's request for an Individual Partnership Action Plan was approved by NATO, and Serbia submitted a draft IPAP in May 2013.  The agreement was finalized on 15 January 2015.  It regularly participates in its military maneuvers, and hosted a joint civil protection exercise with NATO in 2018.

2022-present: Russian invasion of Ukraine
Following the start of the Russian invasion of Ukraine, several neutral states reconsidered their alignment, including Finland and Sweden which applied for NATO membership.  However, Serbian President Aleksandar Vucic, in office since 2017, reiterated in March 2022 that his government was not interested in NATO membership.  The minor Serbian Renewal Movement, which has two seats in the National Assembly, and the Liberal Democratic Party, which currently has none, remain the most vocal political parties in favor of NATO membership. The Democratic Party abandoned its pro-NATO attitude, claiming the Partnership for Peace is enough.

Serbia maintains close relations with Russia, due to their shared Slavic and Eastern Orthodox culture but also due to its support on the Kosovo issue. Serbia and Belarus are the only European states which refused to impose sanctions on Russia in response to its invasion of Ukraine.

Opinion polling on Serbian NATO membership

An opinion poll in September 2007 showed that 28% of Serbian citizens supported NATO membership, with 58% supporting the Partnership for Peace. However, following NATO's open support to Kosovo's declaration of independence in 2008, support for NATO integration significantly dropped.  A poll from March 2022 found that 82% of Serbians opposed joining NATO, while only 10% supported the idea.

See also
Foreign relations of Serbia
 Foreign relations of NATO 
 Enlargement of NATO 
 NATO open door policy
 Partnership for Peace

Serbia's relations with NATO member states:

  Albania
  Belgium
  Bulgaria
  Canada
  Croatia
  Czech Republic
  Denmark
  Estonia
  France
  Germany
  Greece
  Hungary
  Iceland
  Italy
  Latvia
  Lithuania
  Luxembourg
  Montenegro
  Netherlands
  North Macedonia
  Norway
  Poland
  Portugal
  Romania
  Slovakia
  Slovenia
  Spain
  Turkey
  United Kingdom
  United States

References

Foreign relations of Serbia
NATO relations